Alfred Unser Jr. (born April 19, 1962), nicknamed "Little Al", "Al Junior", or simply "Junior", is a retired American race car driver and two-time Indianapolis 500 winner.

History
Unser was born into a racing family in Albuquerque, New Mexico. He is the son of Al Unser and the nephew of Bobby Unser, both Indianapolis 500 winners themselves. The Unser family has won the Indy 500 a record nine times.

Early career
By the age of 11, Al Junior was racing sprint cars. After high school, he was already in the World of Outlaws series of sprint car racing. He soon moved into road racing, winning the Super Vee title in 1981 and the Can-Am title in 1982.

Rising CART star
In 1982, Unser made his debut on the CART circuit. He suffered personal tragedy when his sister Debbie was killed in a dune buggy accident, but this did not deter Unser; and a year later, he competed in his first Indianapolis 500, finishing 9th. However, hours after the race ended, Unser Jr. was issued a 2-lap penalty by chief steward Thomas W. Binford for passing 2 cars under caution with less than 40 laps to go as well as blocking eventual winner Tom Sneva from getting by his father with less than 20 laps to go. The penalty dropped him from an original finish of 9th, to 10th. Despite being lauded for his performance as a rookie, Unser Jr. narrowly lost the rookie of the year award to Teo Fabi.

Unser continued racing on the CART circuit, becoming one of the series' rising stars. He finished second in the CART championship point standings in 1985, losing to his father by just one point. He began competing in the IROC championship in 1986, winning that championship with two victories in four races. At the age of 24, Unser was the youngest IROC champion ever. Unser won the 1986 and 1988 IROC championships, the final Indycar driver to win an IROC championship. Unser won the 24 Hours of Daytona, also at age 24 for the first time in 1986 and again in 1987.

Unser continued to improve on the CART circuit, finishing fourth in the points standings in 1986, third in 1987, second in 1988 and finally winning the series for the first time in 1990. In 1989, Unser was on the verge of winning his first Indianapolis 500, but while battling with Emerson Fittipaldi for the lead, the two touched wheels and Unser spun out, hitting the wall and ending his chances. This race is remembered for a remarkable show of sportsmanship, as Little Al climbed out of his wrecked racecar and gave Fittipaldi the "thumbs up" as he drove by Unser under caution. Unser would have his day at Indy in 1992, however, defeating Scott Goodyear by 0.043 of a second, the closest finish in Indianapolis 500 history.

During the off-season he drove in the 1993 Daytona 500 for Hendrick Motorsports finishing 36th in what would be his only NASCAR start. He ran well in the race, running with the lead pack all day, until a late race crash with Kyle Petty and Bobby Hillin Jr. During an interview with Mike Joy after the accident, Joy asked him if he would be back. Unser said that he wanted to come back, but it would never happen. Unser also tested a Williams F1 car but never competed in the series.

Penske years

In 1994, Unser again won at Indy, this time with Penske Racing. His teammates were Emerson Fittipaldi, the man whom he battled with five years before, and Paul Tracy. Unser turned in a dominant season-long performance, winning eight of 16 races on his way to his second CART championship, as well as being named ABC's Wide World of Sports Athlete of the Year that year. In 1995 Unser, along with teammate Emerson Fittipaldi, failed to qualify at Indianapolis, and he would later point to this as the trigger event for his descent into alcoholism and the breakup of his marriage. He would finish second to Jacques Villeneuve in CART championship points in 1995. He finished fourth in 1996, despite having a chance of winning the championship until the end of the season.

Unser ranked 13th in 1997, 11th in 1998 and 21st in 1999, not helped by the fact that he had to sit out two races after breaking his leg in the season-opener at Miami in a first-lap accident. Little Al's decline in performance coincided with the Penske team's struggles with their in-house chassis,  Mercedes engines and  Goodyear tires, which were being abandoned by most teams during this era in favor of  Firestones. His teammates suffered similarly disappointing results during this time.

Team Penske began abandoning the maligned in-house Penske chassis for customer Lola chassis during the 1999 season. By the end of 1999, Unser and Penske parted ways and, combined with the death of Gonzalo Rodríguez, Penske replaced Unser and Rodriguez with Helio Castroneves and Gil de Ferran. Unser would leave CART to join the budding Indy Racing League for the 2000 campaign.

Unser won a total of 31 races during his 17 seasons in CART. His career win total including IRL stands at 34, which is currently the sixth-most all time in American open wheel racing (as of 2013). As a two-time Indy 500 and two-time overall points champion, Unser enjoyed a decorated career as one of the most dynamic and successful drivers in American auto racing.(9)

Indy Racing League
Unser would go on to win a total of three races in his IRL career, but after breaking his pelvis in an all-terrain vehicle accident in October 2003, Unser had difficulty securing a ride for the 2004 season. He finally signed with Patrick Racing three races into the season, but after a 22nd-place finish in Richmond, Unser finally announced his retirement from racing on June 30, 2004. Unser continued to remain involved in racing, however, outside of a driving capacity.  He served as an adviser for Patrick Racing and worked as a mentor for his son, Al Richard Unser, who was working his way through the lower ranks of open-wheel racing at the time.

Post-retirement racing and personal issues

In 2006 Unser announced that he would come back to racing again and he would run the 2006 Indianapolis 500, teamed with fellow former winner Buddy Lazier for Dreyer & Reinbold Racing. This came just days after Michael Andretti also came out of retirement to run the 500. Unser qualified 27th in the 33-car field, and consistently ran in the upper half until a crash ended his day.

In late August, Unser took part in an A1 Grand Prix test session at Silverstone.

On 25 January 2007, Unser was arrested and charged with driving under the influence, misdemeanor hit and run, failure to render aid in an accident and failure to report an accident near Henderson, Nevada, USA.

On 2 May 2007, it was announced that Unser would drive a car for racing legend A. J. Foyt in the 2007 Indianapolis 500, carrying the No. 50 on his car in recognition of A. J.'s 50 years at the storied race. Unser qualified in the 25th starting position after being bumped from the lineup on the second day of qualifying.

On 18 May 2007, Unser spoke publicly for the first time about his battle with alcoholism when he joined forces with LIVE outside the Bottle, a national educational campaign to help the public understand the need for addressing and treating alcoholism.

During the race weekend of the 2009 Toyota Grand Prix of Long Beach, Unser confirmed that his IndyCar career was in fact over. During the weekend, he returned to the Toyota Pro/Celebrity Race that he won in 1985, and scored his second win in the event and his eighth Long Beach victory overall.

In 2010, Unser started the Race Clinic for Paralysis charity.

Unser is on the board of Baltimore Racing Development and helped announce plans for the 2011 Baltimore Grand Prix on Monday, August 17, 2009.

Unser was inducted into the Motorsports Hall of Fame of America in 2009.

On September 29, 2011 Unser was arrested in Albuquerque, New Mexico on charges of reckless driving and aggravated driving while intoxicated. Charges stemmed from an incident where Unser reportedly drag raced his Chevrolet Suburban SUV at speeds of over 100 mph. He was placed on indefinite suspension from his role with IndyCar.

In 2013, Unser entered a sportscar race at Thunderhill Raceway Park, the legendary 25 Hours of Thunderhill, racing with his son Al III as teammates.  Unser dominated the race, but co-driver Ivan Bellarosa crashed the car out.

In 2014, once again at Long Beach he participated in the Pro/Celebrity race, finishing fifth, 6.115 seconds behind winner Brett Davern and four other celebrities, winning the Pro Division (30-second disadvantage assessed to professionals) for his ninth Long Beach victory overall, extending the "King of the Beach" nickname.  Later that year, Unser raced again at the Indianapolis Motor Speedway, participating in the Indy Legends Charity Pro/Am race, during the Sportscar Vintage Racing Association's Brickyard Vintage Racing Invitational event. This two-driver race included an Indianapolis 500 veteran in each car.  Unser won the race, along with Peter Klutt, driving Klutt's 1969 Chevrolet Corvette.  In so doing, Unser became the second driver to win on both the oval and road course at the Speedway.

In 2015, Unser participated in several Goodguys AutoCross competitions while racing Speedway Motors' 1970 Camaro. He also raced in the Sports Car Club of America Solo National Championship, placing second in his class, and is entered again at Thunderhill for the 25 Hours.  Because of his age (over 50), Unser is eligible to drop down a level from professional class to an "amateur" class (Silver level) under the FIA driver rankings used for sportscar races, although the National Auto Sport Association does not use such ratings.

On May 20, 2019, just days before the 2019 Indianapolis 500, Unser Jr. was charged for DUI for a fourth time.

On October 1, 2021, Unser's memoir entitled Al Unser Jr: A Checkered Past, co-authored by Jade Gurss, was published by Octane Press.

Personal life
Unser married Shelley; the couple later divorced. He has four children, Al Richard Unser, Cody Unser, Shannon Unser, and Joe Unser. Cody lost the use of her legs on February 5, 1999 when she was 12 years old. She, along with her mother Shelley, founded the organization "Cody Unser First Step Foundation" at age 13 and she writes about the cause on U.S. News & World Report. Shelley Unser died on August 15, 2018. On September 30, 2021, Unser Jr. married Norma Lawrence.

Motorsports career results

American Open Wheel racing results
(key) (Races in bold indicate pole position)

Formula Super Vee

PPG Indycar Series

IndyCar Series
(key)

Indianapolis 500 results

NASCAR
(key) (Bold – Pole position awarded by qualifying time. Italics – Pole position earned by points standings or practice time. * – Most laps led.)

Winston Cup Series

Daytona 500

International Race of Champions
(key) (Bold – Pole position. * – Most laps led.)

Video games
Al Unser Jr.'s Turbo Racing, a 1990 NES game featuring Unser.
Al Unser Jr.'s Road to the Top, a 1994 SNES game.
An unreleased Sega Genesis game featuring Unser titled Al Unser Jr. Racing was showcased at the 1994 SCES.
Al Unser Jr. Arcade Racing, a 1995 computer game featuring Unser.

Pop culture references
In season 11, episode 12 of The Simpsons called The Mansion Family (originally aired on January 23, 2000), Bart is riding a bicycle through Mr. Burns's mansion screaming "I'm Al Unser Jr."

References

External links

LIVE Outside The Bottle Official Site
The Greatest 33
Al Unser Jr: A Checkered Past

Living people
1962 births
Racing drivers from Albuquerque, New Mexico
Indianapolis 500 drivers
Indianapolis 500 polesitters
Indianapolis 500 winners
24 Hours of Daytona drivers
Champ Car champions
Champ Car drivers
IndyCar Series drivers
Atlantic Championship drivers
NASCAR drivers
International Race of Champions drivers
American Speed Association drivers
SCCA Formula Super Vee drivers
Formula Super Vee Champions
USAC Silver Crown Series drivers
World of Outlaws drivers
American people of Swiss-German descent
Unser family
Team Penske drivers
Forsythe Racing drivers
Dreyer & Reinbold Racing drivers
A. J. Foyt Enterprises drivers
Hendrick Motorsports drivers
USAC Gold Crown champions